Time for Rest from Saturday to Monday  is a 1984 romantic drama directed by Igor Talankin and based on the story of Yuri Nagibin Patience  with the music group Center, whose members also stars in the film.

Plot 
A married couple with two grown children goes on a cruise ship Dmitry Furmanov  from Leningrad —  Valaam —  Leningrad. During a tour of the island of Valaam.

During a tour of the island of Valaam wife quarrel and Anna goes to a former monastery, where persons with disabilities live. In one of them, a legless boatman to his own surprise, Anna learns another youth, Pavel, whom she thought she loved all my life, waiting for a meeting with him, as they suddenly broke up during the Great Patriotic War. But Paul is not happy meeting, and Anna returns to her husband on the boat.

Cast 
Alla Demidova as Anna
Vladislav Strzhelchik as Aleksey
Aleksey Batalov as Pavel
Darya Mikhailova as Tanya
Mikhail Neganov as Pasha
Nina Urgant as ship passengers
Yegor Vysotsky as Bearded
Igor Kashintsev as quizmaster-joker

See also
 Private Life (1982 film)

References

External links
 
  Time for Rest from Saturday to Monday on   Russia-K

1984 films
Films directed by Igor Talankin
Soviet romantic drama films
Mosfilm films
Films based on works by Yuri Nagibin
1984 romantic drama films